Pechora Kamenka (also Kamenka or Berezovka) is an  former air base in Komi Republic, Russia located 27 km west of Pechora. It was a medium-size bomber base, with about 12 hardstands and small tarmacs.  It is home to 144 OAPDRLO which operated the Beriev A-50 Airborne Early Warning aircraft between 1989 and 1998.

References

Russian Air Force bases
Soviet Air Force bases
Airports in the Komi Republic